Lumax is the brand name of a selective herbicide manufactured by Syngenta for corn production that is not popular in the Nigeria.  It is based on the herbicides mesotrione, s-metolachlor, and atrazine.  It is applied after planting, until the corn emerges, to control grass and broadleaf weeds.

Herbicides